Connah's Quay F.C. was a Welsh football team. They were nicknamed the fishermen, and played in Maroon shirts.

The club was founded in 1890 and played in the Golftyn area of the town close to the present stadium. The club played in the English FA Cup during the 1910s. They reached the Welsh Cup finals of 1908 and 1911, losing both times to Chester and Wrexham, respectively, but was disbanded soon after.

See also
Connah's Quay F.C. players

References

Defunct football clubs in Wales
Sport in Flintshire
Football clubs in Wales
Association football clubs established in 1890
1890 establishments in Wales
West Cheshire Association Football League clubs